Szwed is a Polish language family name. It corresponds to Russian Shved and Lithuanian Švedas. In all these languages the word means "Swede".

The surname may refer to:
John Szwed (born 1936), Professor of Music and Jazz Studies, Columbia University
Aleksandra Szwed (born 1990), Polish actress and singer
Zuzanna Szwed (born 1977), Polish competitive figure skater
Dariusz Szwed (born 1967), Polish politician
Karolina Szwed-Orneborg (born 1989), Polish handball player
Stanisław Szwed (born 1955), Polish politician
Rafał Szwed (born 1973), Polish footballer
Birth surname of Loretta Swit (born 1937), actress

Polish-language surnames
Ethnonymic surnames